Margaret Carr (born 25 November 1935) is a British author of mysteries and romance novels who has written under the pseudonyms of Martin Carroll, Carole Kerr, and Belle Jackson, as well as her own name. Born in Salford, England, she is the daughter of Richard and Isabel Taylor. Critic Herbert Harris says Carr "brings a lighthearted touch to the romantic thriller" meant for an audience of "female readers, particularly the young and unsophisticated...".

Bibliography

As Margaret Carr
 Spring Into Love (1967) 
 Tread Warily at Midnight (1971) 
 Dangerous Affair (1971) 
 Sitting Duck (1972) 
 Who's the Target? (1974) 
 Wait for the Wake (1974) 
 Too Close for Comfort (1974) 
 Blood Will Out (1975) 
 Sharendel (1976) 
 Blindman's Bluff (1976) 
 Out of the Past (1976) 
 Dare the Devil (1976) 
 Twin Tragedy (1977) 
 The Witch of Wykham (1978) 
 An Innocent Abroad (1979) 
 Daggers Drawn (1980) 
 Dark Intruder (1991) 
 Deadly Pursuit (1991) 
 Disputed Love (1999) 
 Beloved Enemy (1999) 
 The Waiting Time (2000) 
 The House in the Pines (2000) 
 The Heat of the Moment (2007) 
 The Art of Romance (2007) 
 A Dark Gentleman (2007) 
 For the Love of a Devil (2009) 
 A Dream Come True (2009) 
 A Caring Heart (2010)

As Martin Carroll
Begotten Murder (1967) 
Blood Vengeance (1968) 
Dead Trouble (1968) 
Goodbye Is Forever (1968) 
Too Beautiful to Die (1969) 
Bait (1970) 
Miranda Said Murder (1970) 
Hear No Evil (1971)

As Carole Kerr
Not for Sale (1975) 
Shadow of the Hunter (1975) 
A Time to Surrender (1975) 
Love All Start (1977) 
Lamb to the Slaughter (1978) 
When Dreams Come True (1980) 
Stolen Heart (1981)

As Belle Jackson
 In the Dark of the Day (1988) 
 Valdez's Lady (1989)

References

1935 births
20th-century English novelists
20th-century British women writers
English crime fiction writers
English mystery writers
Women mystery writers
English romantic fiction writers
21st-century British women writers
Living people